Bilal Sonses (born 28 October 1993) is a Turkish pop music singer-songwriter.

Sonses was born in Fatih, Istanbul. He is a graduate of Mehmet İhsan Mermerci Tourism Hotel Management High School. After completing his high school education, he continued his education with a 2-year associate degree program at Çanakkale Onsekiz Mart University. As of 2019, he continues his undergraduate education at Düzce University.

Sonses opened his own YouTube channel in 2015, performing cover versions of famous songs. Soon he became popular with the public and the channel garnered 1 million subscribers over a short period of time. Sonses, who writes and composes his own songs, has released duets with various artists and provided fellow singers with new songs and pieces. On 12 November 2020, he released a duet with Yıldız Tilbe, titled , the lyrics for which were written by Sonses. The song's music video garnered over one hundred and fifty million views on YouTube. he is the son of artist Mehmet Sonses.

Discography

EPs 
 Öpesim Var  (2017)

Singles 

 "İnat Keçi" (2019)
 "İçimden Gelmiyor" (ft. Bengü) (2019)
 "Sevme" (2019)
 "Sen Aldırma" (ft. Reynmen) (2019)
 "Neyim Olacaktın?" (2019)
 "Cennetten Çiçek" (2019)
 "Sende Kaldı Yüreğim" (ft. Derya Bedavacı) (2020)
 "Sonu Gelmez" (ft. Seda Tripkolic) (2020)
 "Yara" (ft. Ziynet Sali) (2020)
 "Görmedim Sen Gibi" (2020)
 "Nefret" (2020)
 "Geç Değil" (ft. Rozz Kalliope) (2020)
 "Çat Kapı" (2020)
 "" (ft. Yıldız Tilbe) (2020)
 "Sebepsiz Boş Yere" (2021)
 "Şimdiki Aklım" (2021)
 "Dayanırım" (ft. Arda Han) (2021)
 "Bu Aşkta Zararım Var" (2021)
 "Söz Verdim" (2021)
 "Geçmişi Araladım" (2021)
 "Dağlar (Acoustic)" (2022)
 "Bir Kulum İşte (Acoustic)" (2022)
 "Dön Diyemem" (2022)
 "Olmuyor" (2022)
 "Başa Sar" (2022)
 "Ardından" (2023)

Songs written and composed by Sonses 

 Ece Seçkin – "Sen Hala Ordasın" 
 Murat Boz – "Can Kenarım"
 Ebru Yaşar – "Kalmam"
 Mustafa Ceceli – "Bedel" 
 Reynmen – "Hevesim Yok"
 Mustafa Ceceli ft. JİNE – "İmtiyaz"
 Bengü – "Kimse Bilmesin"
 İrem Derici – "Ara Sıra"
 Alişan – "Dön Hadi"

''* The list above includes songs given to other artists whose lyrics or music belong to Sonses. He has performed songs that are written and composed by himself but are not mentioned in this list.

Awards

References

External links 
 
 
 Bilal Sonses on Spotify

Living people
1989 births
Turkish singer-songwriters
21st-century Turkish singers
Turkish musicians
21st-century Turkish male singers